Cothocidae or Kothokidai was a deme of ancient Attica, originally of the phyle of Oeneis, but between 307/306 BCE and 201/200 BCE of the phyle of Demetrias, sending two delegates to the Athenian Boule. 

Its site is tentatively located near Ag. Ioannes, north of modern Aspropyrgos.

References

Populated places in ancient Attica
Former populated places in Greece
Demoi